Wang Pengfei is a Chinese Sanda kickboxer. As of February 2021, he is the #4 ranked super-featherweight according to Combat Press.

Titles and accomplishments

Amateur
 3x Liaoning Province Sanda Champion 
 2013 China -71 kg Kickboxing Championship Runner-up

Professional
Wu Lin Feng
 2014 Wu Lin Feng Rookie of the Year
 2019 Wu Lin Feng World -65 kg Champion (Defended once)
 2019 Wu Lin Feng Fighter of the Year
 2021 Wu Lin Feng Global Kung Fu -67 kg Tournament Winner
 2021 Wu Lin Feng Fight of the Year (vs Liu Xiangming)

Kickboxing record

|-  style="background:#fbb;"
| 2022-01-01 || Loss || align=left| Meng Gaofeng|| Wu Lin Feng 2022 || Tangshan, China || Decision (Unanimous)|| 5 || 3:00
|-  
! style=background:white colspan=9 |Loses the Wu Lin Feng World -65 kg title.

|-  style="background:#cfc;"
| 2021-11-27 || Win || align=left| Zhou Jiaqiang || Wu Lin Feng 2021: World Contender League 7th Stage Contender League Semi Final|| Zhengzhou, China || Decision ||3 ||3:00
 
|-  style="background:#fbb;"
| 2021-09-30 || Loss || align=left| Jia Aoqi || Wu Lin Feng 2021: World Contender League 6th Stage || Zhengzhou, China || Decision (Unanimous)|| 3 || 3:00 
|-  style="background:#cfc;"
| 2021-07-03 || Win || align=left| Hu Yafei || Wu Lin Feng 2021: World Contender League 5th Stage || Zhengzhou, China || Decision (Unanimous) ||  3|| 3:00
|-  style="background:#cfc;"
| 2021-05-22 || Win || align=left| Zhou Jiaqiang || Wu Lin Feng 2021: World Contender League 3rd Stage || Xin County, China || Decision (Unanimous)|| 3||3:00
|-  style="background:#cfc;"
| 2021-04-24 || Win || align=left| Er Kang || Wu Lin Feng 2021: World Contender League 2nd Stage || Zhengzhou, China || Decision (Unanimous)|| 3||3:00
|-  style="background:#cfc;"
| 2021-01-23 || Win || align=left| Liu Xiangming || Wu Lin Feng 2021: Global Kung Fu Festival, -67 kg Tournament Final || Macao, China || TKO (3 Knockdowns/Punches) || 2||
|-  
! style=background:white colspan=9 |Wins the Wu Lin Feng -67 kg Global Kung Fu Tournament.
|-  style="background:#cfc;"
| 2021-01-23 || Win || align=left| Tie Yinghua || Wu Lin Feng 2021: Global Kung Fu Festival, -67 kg Tournament Semi Final || Macao, China || Decision (Unanimous) ||3 ||3:00
|-  style="background:#cfc;"
| 2021-01-23 || Win || align=left| Wei Ninghui || Wu Lin Feng 2021: Global Kung Fu Festival, -67 kg Tournament Quarter Final || Macao, China || Decision (Unanimous) ||3 ||3:00
|-  style="background:#fbb;"
| 2020-10-16 || Loss|| align=left| Wei Ninghui|| Wu Lin Feng 2020: China New Kings Champions Challenge match || Hangzhou, China || Decision  || 3 || 3:00
|-  style="background:#cfc;"
| 2020-08-29 || Win|| align=left| Zhang Chunyu || Wu Lin Feng 2020: China New Kings Tournament Final || Zhengzhou, China || Decision  || 3 || 3:00
|-  style="background:#fbb;"
| 2020-06-13 || Loss || align=left| Wei Rui || Wu Lin Feng 2020: King's Super Cup 2nd Group Stage || Zhengzhou, China || Decision (Unanimous) || 3 || 3:00  
|-
|-  style="background:#fbb;"
| 2020-05-15 || Loss||align=left| Jia Aoqi || Wu Lin Feng 2020: King's Super Cup 1st Group Stage|| Zhengzhou, China || Decision (Split) || 3 || 3:00
|-  style="background:#fbb;"
| 2020-01-11 ||Loss || align=left| Adrian Maxim || Wu Lin Feng 2020: WLF World Cup 2019-2020 Final|| Zhuhai, China || Decision (unanimous) || 3 || 3:00
|-  style="background:#cfc;"
| 2019-11-30 || Win || align=left| Liu Xiangming || Wu Lin Feng 2019: WLF -67kg World Cup 2019-2020 6th Group Stage || Zhengzhou, China || Decision (Split) || 5 || 3:00 
|- 
! style=background:white colspan=9 |Defends the Wu Lin Feng World -65 kg title.
|-  style="background:#fbb;"
| 2019-09-06|| Loss||align=left| Rambo Petch Por.Tor.Aor || Wu Lin Feng 2019: WLF at Lumpinee - China vs Thailand || Bangkok, Thailand || TKO (Injury)|| 1 || 3:00
|-  style="background:#cfc;"
| 2019-07-21 || Win || align=left| Kota Nakano|| Wu Lin Feng x Krush 103 - China vs Japan|| Tokyo, Japan || Decision (Majority) || 3 || 3:00
|-  style="background:#cfc;"
| 2019-04-27 || Win || align=left| Jordan Marciano|| Wu Lin Feng 2019: WLF -63kg Championship World Tournament|| Zhuhai, China || KO (Punches) || 2 ||
|-  style="background:#cfc;"
| 2019-03-24 || Win||align=left| Ilias Myrdini || Wu Lin Feng 2019: WLF x Gods of War XII - China vs Greece|| Athens, Greece || Decision (Unanimous)  || 3|| 3:00
|-  style="background:#cfc;"
| 2019-01-02 || Win || align=left| Diego Freitas || Wu Lin Feng 2019: -65kg World Championship Tournament Final|| Hengqin, China || Decision || 3 || 3:00 
|- 
! style=background:white colspan=9 |Wins the Wu Lin Feng World -65 kg title.
|-  style="background:#cfc;"
| 2019-01-02 || Win || align=left| Lu Jun || Wu Lin Feng 2019: -65kg World Championship Tournament Semi Finals|| Hengqin, China || Decision || 3 || 3:00
|-  style="background:#cfc;"
| 2019-01-02 || Win || align=left| Hamza Essalih || Wu Lin Feng 2019: -65kg World Championship Tournament Quarter Finals|| Hengqin, China || Ext.R Decision || 4 || 3:00
|-  style="background:#FFBBBB;"
| 2018-11-03 || Loss||align=left| Aleksei Ulianov || Wu Lin Feng 2018: WLF -67kg World Cup 2018-2019 5th Round || China || Decision|| 3 || 3:00
|-  style="background:#cfc;"
| 2018-09-29 || Win||align=left| Zyodila Kubanov || David Zunwu World Fighting Championship || Macau || TKO|| 2 ||
|-  style="background:#cfc;"
| 2018-09-01 || Win||align=left| Meng Qinghao || Wu Lin Feng 2018: WLF -67kg World Cup 2018-2019 3rd Round || Zhengzhou, China || Decision  || 3 || 3:00
|-  style="background:#FFBBBB;"
| 2018-07-07 || Loss||align=left| Jomthong Chuwattana || Wu Lin Feng 2018: WLF -67kg World Cup 2018-2019 1st Round || Zhengzhou, China || Decision (Unanimous) || 3 || 3:00
|-  style="background:#cfc;"
| 2018-06-16 || Win ||align=left| Klimov || Wu Lin Feng 2018: China vs Netherlands & Russia || Shenyang, China || Decision (Unanimous) || 3 || 3:00
|-  style="background:#FFBBBB;"
| 2018-04-07 || Loss||align=left| Adrian Maxim || Wu Lin Feng 2018: World Championship Shijiazhuang || Shijiazhuang, China || Ext.R Decision  || 4 || 3:00
|-  style="background:#cfc;"
| 2018-03-24 || Win||align=left| Sokratis Kerpatsi || Wu Lin Feng 2018: Greece VS China - Gods of War 11|| Athens, Greece || KO (Right High Kick)  || 3||
|-  style="background:#cfc;"
| 2018-02-03 || Win||align=left| Juan Javier Barragan|| Wu Lin Feng 2018: World Championship in Shenzhen || Shenzhen, China ||  KO || 2||
|-  style="background:#cfc;"
| 2017-09-09 || Win||align=left| Tula || Wu Lin Feng New Generation|| Linyi, China ||  KO || 2|| 2:45
|-  style="background:#cfc;"
| 2017-08-05 || Win || align=left| Singsuriya || Wu Lin Feng 2017: China VS Thailand|| Zhengzhou, China || Decision (Unanimous) || 3 || 3:00
|-  style="background:#cfc;"
| 2017-06-03 || Win || align=left| Shota Hayashi || Wu Lin Feng 2017: China VS Japan || Changsha, China || Decision (Unanimous) || 3 || 3:00
|- style="background:#cfc;"
| 2017-05-06 || Win ||align=left| Massaro Glunder || Wu Lin Feng 2017: China VS USA || Zhengzhou, China || Decision (Unanimous) || 3 || 3:00
|-  bgcolor="#cfc"
| 2017-03-25|| Win|| align=left| Quade Taranaki  || Wu Lin Feng China vs New Zealand || Zhengzhou, China || Decision || 3||3:00
|-  bgcolor="#cfc"
| 2017-03-04 || Win|| align=left| Khyzer Hayat Nawaz  || Wu Lin Feng 2017: Kung Fu VS Muay Thai || Zhengzhou, China || TKO || 1||
|-  bgcolor="#FFBBBB"
| 2017-01-14 || Loss|| align=left| Kaew Fairtex  || Wu Lin Feng 2016 World Kickboxing Championship || Zhengzhou, China || Decision (Unanimous) || 3 || 3:00
|-  style="background:#cfc;"
| 2016-12-03 || Win || align=left| Hiromitsu Miyagi || Wu Lin Feng 2016: WLF x Krush - China vs Japan|| Zhengzhou, China || TKO (3 Knockdowns/Left High Kick) || 2 ||
|-  style="background:#cfc;"
| 2016-11-17 || Win || align=left| Joey Pagliuso || Wu Lin Feng 2016: China vs USA || Las Vegas, United States || KO (Right Hook) || 2 ||
|-  style="background:#cfc;"
| 2016-10-15 || Win || align=left| Sasha || WKPL Dream Heroes World Boxing Championship|| Fengcheng, Jiangxi, China || Decision || 3 ||  3:00
|-  style="background:#FFBBBB;"
| 2016-08-20 || Loss||align=left| Masaaki Noiri  || Krush 68 || Tokyo, Japan || KO (Left middle Kick) || 1 || 1:37
|- style="background:#fbb;"
| 2016-07-15 || Loss||align=left| Tamerlan Bashirov || Wu Lin Feng : Russia vs China || Zhengzhou, China || Decision (Unanimous) || 3 || 3:00
|- style="background:#cfc;"
| 2016-06-17 ||Win ||align=left| Kevin Burmester || Wu Lin Feng 2017: China VS Germany || Zhengzhou, China || Decision || 3 || 3:00
|-  style="background:#cfc;"
| 2016-04-30 || Win || align=left| Jonatan Fabian || Wu Lin Feng || Zhengzhou, China || Decision  || 3 || 3:00
|-  bgcolor="#FFBBBB"
| 2016-04-02 || Loss||align=left| Umar Semata || EM Legend 7 || Xichang, China || Decision || 3 || 3:00
|-  style="background:#FFBBBB;"
| 2015-12-17 || Loss|| align=left| Juri Kehl || Mix Fight Gala XIX || Germany || Decision|| 3|| 3:00
|-  style="background:#FFBBBB;"
| 2015-09-12 || Loss|| align=left| Ariyal Saklov || Huawu Finals Series 3 || Yantai, China || KO|| ||
|-  bgcolor="#FFBBBB"
| 2015-06-26|| Loss ||align=left| Kem Sitsongpeenong || Silu Hero || Ürümqi, China  || KO (right knee to the body) || 2 ||
|-  style="background:#FFBBBB;"
| 2015-04-04 || Loss|| align=left| Yang Zhuo || Wu Lin Feng 2015 World 67 kg Tournament, quarter final || Zhengzhou, China || TKO || 2 ||
|-  style="background:#cfc;"
| 2015-04-04 || Win || align=left| Charlie Peters || Wu Lin Feng 2015 World 67 kg Tournament, 1st round || Zhengzhou, China || Decision (Split) || 3 || 3:00
|-  style="background:#cfc;"
| 2014-12-31 || Win|| align=left| Lianchai|| Legend of Kung fu World Championship || Luoyang, China || KO (Fying Knee) || 1 || 2:28
|-  style="background:#FFBBBB;"
| 2014-10-25 || Loss|| align=left| Rafik Casi|| Wu Lin Feng || Netherlands ||  ||  ||
|-  style="background:#cfc;"
| 2014-07-05 || Win || align=left||| Wu Lin Feng || Dublin, Ireland ||  ||  ||
|-  style="background:#FFBBBB;"
| 2014-04-27 || Loss|| align=left| Qiu Jianliang || Wu Lin Feng World Championship 2014 – 67 kg Tournament, Final || Luohe, China || Decision (Unanimous) || 3 || 3:00 
|- 
! style=background:white colspan=9 |For the Wu Lin Feng International -65 kg title.
|-  style="background:#cfc;"
| 2014-04-27 || Win || align=left| || Wu Lin Feng World Championship 2014 – 67 kg Tournament, Semi Finals || Luohe, China || KO  || 1 ||  
|-
|-  bgcolor="#cfc"
| 2014-01-18 || Win||align=left| Arthur Sorsor || Wu Lin Feng || Xiangyang, China || Decision (Split) || 3 || 3:00
|-  bgcolor="#FFBBBB"
| 2014-01-01 || Loss||align=left| Han Jie || Zhenhua Heroes  || Changchun, China || Decision || 3 || 3:00
|-
! style=background:white colspan=9 |
|-  bgcolor="#cfc"
| 2013-12-31 || Win||align=left| Ahu || Zhenhua Heroes  || Changchun, China || Decision || 3 || 3:00

|-
| colspan=9 | Legend:    

|-  bgcolor="#FFBBBB"
| 2012-05-20 || Loss||align=left| Tie Yinghua || 2012 China Kickboxing Championships  || Kaifeng, China || Decision || 3 || 3:00
|-
| colspan=9 | Legend:

References 

Chinese male kickboxers
1993 births
Living people
Chinese sanshou practitioners
Sportspeople from Henan
People from Zhoukou